The 2012 Red Deer Curling Classic was held from November 2 to 5 at the Red Deer Curling Club in Red Deer, Alberta as part of the 2012–13 World Curling Tour. The event was held in a triple knockout format. The purse for the men's event was CAD$33,000, of which the winner, Brendan Bottcher, received CAD$9,000. The purse for the women's event was CAD$36,000, of which the winner, Chelsea Carey, received CAD$9,500. Bottcher defeated Kevin Koe in the men's final with a score of 6–3, while Carey defeated Kaitlyn Lawes, who was skipping in place of Jennifer Jones, in the women's final with a score of 7–3.

Men

Teams
The teams are listed as follows:

Knockout results

Source:

A event

B event

C event

Playoffs

Source:

Women

Teams
The teams are listed as follows:

Knockout results

Source:

A event

B event

C event

Playoffs

References

External links

Men's Event
Women's Event

 
2012 in Canadian curling
Sports competitions in Red Deer, Alberta
Curling in Alberta